Stoupa is a village on the coast of the southern Peloponnese peninsula in Greece. It is part of the community of Neochori within the municipal unit of West Mani, in Messenia and the historic region of Mani Peninsula.

Once a sleepy little town, in the past few years more and more tourists have discovered Stoupa. There are about 20 restaurants lining the road along the beach, a few small hotels, and many rental houses. Besides Greek tourists, who come mostly in August, British and German, as well as Dutch, French and Italian tourists visit in the summer season.

Geography

Stoupa is located in an area of Greece called Outer Mani. Approximately  from Stoupa is the village of Agios Nikolaos (also known as Selinitsa meaning small moon), a working fishing village which also has a number of restaurants and guest houses but which attracts fewer tourists than Stoupa. Above Agios Nikolaos is the lovely small village called Riglia. Other places in the Mani region include Itylo, Limeni and Areopoli. Below Areopoli are the caves of Pirgos Dirou.

There are many beaches and coves around the area including Stoupa Beach, which is the most popular and has a good beginner's snorkeling site at the end of the beach. Over the hill is Kalogria Beach, with its turquoise waters and rich marine life, volleyball net, a scuba-diving center, and a handful of bars and restaurants. 

One of the features of both Kalogria and Stoupa beach is the upwelling of underground freshwater springs. Many locations of submarine groundwater discharge (SGD) are easily visible on the sea surface around the bay and can be seen as disturbancse on the surface of the sea.
These submarine springs were reported in 1975, although local inhabitants were well aware of their existence, claiming the springs had never stopped emanating water during, at least, for the past 60 years.

History

In the past, the Mani area was known for its fierce inhabitants, who lived in isolated fortified towers (some of which are still present today, either in ruins or having been restored). The towers offered protection in an area where feuding was commonplace.

Stoupa also has rich cultural history. It is where the Greek writer Nikos Kazantzakis travelled to with George Zorbas who Kazantzakis employed as the foreman of his lignite mine, the entrance to which can still be seen in a hillside nearby. It is their time together in Stoupa that the novel Zorba the Greek is based upon, written after hearing news of Zorba's death. There is a bust of Nikos Kazantzakis on the cliff overlooking Kalogria beach, at the corner of the main road and the beach approach. Stoupa is just 7 km away from the historic area of Kardamyli, which is mentioned in work by Homer.

Furthermore, situated atop Stoupa's hill is the Lefktro (Beaufort or Kastraki) Castle. It was founded by the ruler of the Principality of Achaia, William of Villehardouin, in 1248-1249, during his efforts to subdue the Melingoi of Mount Taygetus. The castle is built on a plateau formed on the summit of a hill, overlooking the coastal zone of Messenian Mani and the passages to Taygetus. The wall of the castle follows the morphology of the terrain and extends from northeast to southwest, made of irregular stones with fragments of bricks that form rectangular protrusions and a semicircular tower on the south. The entrance, in the eastern side of the enclosure, is protected by a square tower. On the east, there is a rectangular antechamber with a loophole. Remnants of the inner wall that used to divide the castle into two parts are still present. A square tower (donjon) and a big cistern are preserved on the southern part, with very few remnants of buildings on the northern part.

Transport

There are approximately four buses a day which call through Stoupa, running from Kalamata to the southern tip of the peninsula. The bus stops by the bakery, on the main road at the top of Stoupa and takes around ten minutes to reach Agios Nikolaos.

Visitors can book coach trips to the ancient ruins of Olympia and the Corinth Canal. Another possibility is car rental, which allows travellers to take in the sights of places such as Nafplio, Mycenae, Epidavros, and Monemvasia on the Peloponnese.

The area is serviced by Kalamata Airport where charter flights to the rest of Europe are operated in the summer season, as well as scheduled summer flights to Germany, Sweden, Norway, France, Ukraine and Russia operated by Aegean Airlines.

References

External links
Webcam
Stoupa Tourist Guide
Official Website

Populated places in Messenia